Aviavilsa was a cargo airline based in Vilnius, Lithuania.

History
It was established in 1998, and started operations in 1999. It operated cargo services within Europe as well as to Asia and Africa for clients such as the United Nations. Its main base was Vilnius Airport. The ATR-42 was on lease to AlbaStar and flying in Sardinia. One of the AN-26 aircraft flew long-term for DHL. The airline had ceased operations by 2018.

Fleet
The Aviavilsa fleet included the following aircraft (as of 2012):

1 ATR 42-300
2 Antonov An-26, including one An-26B variant

References

External links
Aviavilsa
Aviavilsa Fleet

Defunct airlines of Lithuania
Airlines established in 1998
Airlines disestablished in 2018
Companies based in Vilnius
2018 disestablishments in Lithuania
Aviation in Vilnius
Lithuanian companies established in 1998